Andreas Theodoropoulos (born 27 June 1971) is a Greek former professional footballer who played as center back and a manager.

Club career
Theodoropoulos started his football career in the mid-80s, in the academies of AO Moschato and then in the men's team, playing as a striker, while he was also a key member of the Piraeus Mixed Team. He continued to Agioi Anargyroi and established himself as the center back, while also competing in the Athens Mixed Team. In 1990 he moved to Nikaia for the local, Aris Nikaia,, playing in the third division. In 1992, he was transferred to Proodeftiki, where he played in the second division and was named the best defender of the league that season.

In the summer 1993, at the age of 21, he took the big step in his career, transferring to AEK Athens of Dušan Bajević, where he was crowned champion of Greece. He did not his manager's trust and did not compete at all in the league managing to appear only once in the Cup. In December 1994 he was transferred to Apollon Athens. With Apollon's shirt he played the two and a half seasons contributing significantly to the output of the team for the only time in its history in Europe and its participation in the UEFA Cup, as a key member of the defense and also in the lost, by the previous team of AEK, Greek Cup final in 1996 by 7–1.

In 1997, he was transferred to Athinaikos, where he was voted for the best eleven of the championship in 1998 and 1999 and that was the last club, where he played in the first division. In 1999 he was transferred to Atromitos and two years later, he transferred to Rodos for a season and then in Vyzas. In January 2003 he moved to Ethnikos Piraeus, where he played until the end of the season, ending his football career.

Managerial career
With his retirement as a football player, Theodoropoulos started working as a coach. In 2004 he assumed the technical leadership of A.O. Ilion, where he worked for two consecutive seasons, until 2006. Then he took over Olympiacos Agios Stefanos, for one season. In 2008 he returned to Proodeftiki, taking over the scouting of the team in third division. In 2009, he again assumed the technical leadership of A.O. Ilion, in which he worked in the for a season, managing to raise it from the first local division. In 2014 he moved to Kalamata, as assistant to Michalis Kavalieris, until the end of the season in 2015 in the third division. In December 2016, he assumed the technical leadership of Vyzas, where he worked until the end of March 2017. He then collaborated with the Nestoras FC Academy as a manager in the field of personal trainer. In 2019, he assumed the Technical Director of the youth departments of Acharnaikos, for two years. The following season, he took over APS Kythinos, which competed in the Cyclades first local division as well as the supervision of the infrastructure departments of the club.

Honours

AEK Athens 
Alpha Ethniki: 1993–94

References

1971 births
Living people
Greek footballers
Super League Greece players
Proodeftiki F.C. players
AEK Athens F.C. players
Apollon Smyrnis F.C. players
Vyzas F.C. players
Ethnikos Piraeus F.C. players
Greek football managers
Vyzas F.C. managers
Association football defenders
Footballers from Piraeus